Albert Bourcier (16 October 1879 – 2 February 1971) was a French equestrian. He competed in the individual dressage event at the 1924 Summer Olympics.

References

External links
 

1879 births
1971 deaths
French male equestrians
Olympic equestrians of France
Equestrians at the 1924 Summer Olympics
Sportspeople from Eure